Rediff.com (stylized as rediff.com) is an Indian news, information, entertainment and shopping web portal. It was founded in 1996. It is headquartered in Mumbai, with offices in Bangalore, New Delhi and New York City.

, it had more than 300 employees. It is one of the earliest web portals and email providers in India. When its founder Ajit Balakrishnan launched Rediff on the NeT, the internet was barely five months old in the country, and had a total of about 18,000 users.

History 
The Rediff.com domain was registered in India in 1996. Early products included the email service Rediffmail and Rediff Shopping, an online marketplace selling electronics and peripherals.

In 2001, Rediff.com was alleged to be in violation of the Securities Act of 1933 for filing a materially false prospectus in relation to an IPO of its American depositary shares. The case was resolved by settlement in 2009.

In April 2001, Rediff.com acquired the India Abroad newspaper.

In 2007, Rediff iShare, a multimedia platform, was released. In 2010, Rediffmail NG was launched, an email service for mobile platforms. In 2012, Rediff launched its Android App for Rediff News.

In April 2016, the company decided to delist from NASDAQ, citing the high cost of reporting requirements, given its financial condition.

References

External links 
 

Companies based in Mumbai
Companies formerly listed on the Nasdaq
Indian companies established in 1996
Online companies of India
Internet properties established in 1996
Mass media companies of India
Software companies based in Mumbai
Web portals
Webmail
1996 establishments in Maharashtra